Pennsylvania Route 77 (PA 77) is a  east–west state highway located in northwest Pennsylvania. The western terminus of the route is at PA 27 in Meadville. The eastern terminus is at PA 426 in Corry.

Route description

PA 77 begins at an intersection with PA 27 in the city of Meadville in Crawford County, heading northeast on two-lane undivided Hickory Street. The road passes homes, crossing into West Mead Township and becoming Blooming Valley Road. The route runs through rural residential areas before continuing into a mix of farmland and woodland with some homes, heading into East Mead Township. PA 77 becomes unnamed and runs through more rural areas, passing through a corner of Woodcock Township prior to entering the borough of Blooming Valley. Here, the road becomes State Street and passes a few homes, reaching an intersection with PA 198. The route heads back into agricultural and wooded areas with some residences as it crosses into Richmond Township. PA 77 becomes unnamed and passes through more rural areas, running through New Richmond before forming a brief concurrency with PA 408. The road heads into Athens Township and passes through Little Cooley before crossing Muddy Creek in a wooded area. 

The route runs through more farms and woods with a few homes, heading into Bloomfield Township. In this area, PA 77 passes through Riceville and crosses Oil Creek before intersecting PA 8. From here, the road heads through more rural areas and continues into Sparta Township, passing through Britton Run. Farther northeast, the route comes to an intersection with PA 89 and turns north to join that route, heading through more farmland and woodland with a few residences. PA 77 splits from PA 89 by heading east on Main Street, entering the borough of Spartansburg and passing homes and businesses. The route passes south of Clear Lake and turns northeast onto Spring Street, running past more residences. The road heads back into Sparta Township and continues through areas of farm fields and woods with some homes.

PA 77 enters Concord Township in Erie County and turns north as Spartansburg Highway, running through more farmland and woodland with some residences. The road runs through wooded areas with some fields and homes, passing to the west of Corry-Lawrence Airport as it crosses into the city of Corry. Here, the route becomes Union Street and passes through woods, turning east onto West Main Street and passing through industrial and business areas with some homes as it runs a short distance to the south of a Western New York and Pennsylvania Railroad line. PA 77 ends at an intersection with PA 426 in the commercial downtown of Corry, where the road continues east as East Main Street, which is a part of PA 426.

Major intersections

See also

References

External links

Pennsylvania Highways: PA 77

077
Transportation in Crawford County, Pennsylvania
Transportation in Erie County, Pennsylvania